Evelyn Catherine Laura Williamson (born 30 August 1971 in Hamilton, New Zealand) is an athlete from New Zealand, who competes in triathlon.

Williamson competed at the first Olympic triathlon at the 2000 Summer Olympics. She took twenty-second place with a total time of 2:05:38.30.

Williamson placed 3rd at the 1998 ITU Triathlon World Championships.

Williamson qualified as the alternate for the 2008 Beijing Olympics, but as New Zealand does not send their alternates along with the three-person team, she did not attend.

References

1971 births
Living people
Olympic triathletes of New Zealand
Triathletes at the 2000 Summer Olympics
Sportspeople from Hamilton, New Zealand
Triathletes at the 2002 Commonwealth Games
Commonwealth Games competitors for New Zealand
New Zealand female triathletes
20th-century New Zealand women
21st-century New Zealand women